Piperonal, also known as heliotropin, is an organic compound which is commonly found in fragrances and flavors.  The molecule is structurally related to other aromatic aldehydes such as benzaldehyde and vanillin.

Natural occurrence 
Piperonal naturally occurs in various plants. Examples include dill, vanilla, violet flowers, and black pepper.

Preparation
Piperonal can be prepared by the oxidative cleavage of isosafrole or by using a multistep sequence from catechol or 1,2-methylenedioxybenzene. Synthesis from the latter chemical is accomplished through a condensation reaction with glyoxylic acid followed by cleaving the resulting α-hydroxy acid with an oxidizing agent. Synthesis from catechol requires an additional step, Williamson ether synthesis using dichloromethane.

Reactions
Piperonal, like all aldehydes, can be reduced to its alcohol (piperonyl alcohol) or oxidized to give its acid (piperonylic acid).

Piperonal can be used in the synthesis of some pharmaceutical drugs including tadalafil, L-DOPA, and atrasentan.

Fragrance 
Piperonal has a floral odor which is commonly described as being similar to that of vanillin or cherry. For this reason it is commonly used in fragrances and artificial flavors. The compound was named Heliotropin after the 'cherry pie' notes found in the heliotrope flower's fragrance (even though the chemical is not present in the flower's true aroma). Perfumers began to use the fragrance for the first time by the early 1880s. It is commonly used to add vanilla or almond nuances, generally imparting balsamic, powdery, and floral aspects to a scent's character.

Piperonyl acetate is a synthetic cherry flavoring.

Use in MDMA manufacture 
Due to their role in the manufacture of MDMA, safrole, isosafrole, and piperonal are Category I precursors under regulation no. 273/2004 of the European Community.

References

External links 

Benzaldehydes
Benzodioxoles